Probal Dasgupta (born 1953 in Kolkata, India) is an Indian linguist, Esperanto speaker and activist. Dasgupta's interest in linguistics started at a very young age. He published his first article in phonology at the age of eighteen in  Indian Linguistics the journal of the Linguistic Society of India His 1980 New York University PhD dissertation Questions and Relative and Complement Clauses in a Bangla Grammar is considered one of the seminal works in Bangla syntax.

Apart from syntax Dasgupta has worked and written a great deal on morphology and sociolinguistics. He has developed a new approach to linguistics, called Substantivism, in partnership with Rajendra Singh, whose approach to morphology (Whole Word Morphology) forms part of the substantivist programme.

Outside of formal linguistics Dasgupta has written extensively on topics in Esperanto studies, sociolinguistics and literary theory. In his many writings he has also been vocal about political and social issues. "The Otherness of English: India's Auntie Tongue Syndrome", in which he talks of the situation of English in India, has led to various debates on the social implications of the presence of English in India.

Dasgupta has been a member of the Akademio de Esperanto since 1983. He served as the vice-president of the Akademio for five terms from 2001 to 2015. In February 2016 he was elected the Akademio's president for a term of 3 years ending in 2019 and has been re-elected to serve in the same capacity for another term that ends in 2022. Earlier, Dasgupta served as the president of Universal Esperanto Association for two terms, 2007–10 and 2010–13.

In 2006, he moved from the Centre for Applied Linguistics and Translation Studies (CALTS), University of Hyderabad where he had been working as a professor of Linguistics to the Linguistic Research Unit at the Indian Statistical Institute in Kolkata where he was the head from 2008 until his retirement in 2018.

Early life 
Dasgupta was born in 1953 in Kolkata, West Bengal to Arun Kumar Dasgupta (1925-2007) and Manashi Dasgupta (née Roy, 1928–2010). His father Arun was a historian (PhD Cornell, 1962) who taught at several colleges and universities, including Presidency College (Kolkata) and Burdwan University. He retired as Professor of History at the University of Calcutta in 1985. Arun Kumar Dasgupta's work on trade and politics initiated a new line of work especially in maritime historiography. His textbook on the early history of Southeast Asia is still in use.

Dasgupta's mother Manashi was a social psychologist (PhD Cornell, 1962) who served as the Principal of Sri Shikshayatan College (Kolkata). After taking charge of Rabindra Bhavan (Visvabharati, Santiniketan) in 1972, she upgraded its archiving and exhibiting practices, facilitated scholarly access to its holdings and augmented these holdings. She was one of the early students of Rabindrasangeet exponent Debabrata Biswas and became an Rabindrasangeet exponent herself. However, choosing to represent the diversity of Bengali music she focused on Tagore's contemporaries like Rajanikanta Sen, Atul Prasad Sen, Dwijendra Lal Roy. She went on to record a solo album of Atul Prasad Sen's songs in 1970. She also distinguished herself as a creative writer, publishing five novels and over twenty short stories, in addition to books on social psychology and feminist analysis.

In 1957 Probal Dasgupta travelled to Ithaca, NY with his mother to join his father who was pursuing doctoral studies at Cornell University.  Probal's early schooling was at East Hill High School.  During this period the family travelled extensively in Europe where Arun was involved in academic research and archival work as part of his PhD.

In 1961 the family returned to India. On the sea voyage back home Probal met an American who introduced him to the metric system. India had started adopting the metric system in 1957; by 1961 all the markets had big displays showing people how to convert between the old and the new weights and measures.  This encounter drew his attention to systematic convertibility between all codifications, not only quantitative.

Education 
After returning to India his Probal had to write an admission test for one school his parents had applied to, St. Lawrence High School. The results of the test prompted the school authorities to insist that he join the Bangla stream instead of the English stream. His parents were hesitant, as schools at that time still used the archaic, Sanskritized "sadhu bhasha" instead of the colloquial Bangla for textbooks and examinations. However, Probal was able to apply the idea of conversion between codified systems that he learnt from his American fellow passenger on the ship. He coped with the puzzle of converting between the two versions of Bangla. After St. Lawrence he moved to St. Xavier's Collegiate School in 1966 and finished his schooling there in 1970.

For his higher studies Probal chose to study linguistics with Pali as a subsidiary in Kolkata's Sanskrit College. After graduating he moved to Deccan College Postgraduate and Research Institute (Pune, Maharashtra) for higher studies in linguistics. After a year at this Institute Probal was admitted to New York University's Graduate School of Arts and Science for a graduate programme in Linguistics. Probal joined NYU in 1975. In 1980 he completed his PhD on Questions and Relative and Complement clauses in a Bangla grammar (supervisors: Lewis Levine, Ray C. Dougherty).

Professional life 

In his early professional years as a linguist Dasgupta's worked mostly in the field of Syntax. However his first academic publication was in phonology in 1972. Through the 70s and the 80s Dasgupta continued to publish a series of papers on Bangla syntax and phonology. His 1989 book Projective Syntax: Theory and Applications has some non-syntactic chapters but is built around a syntactic core.

In 1993 Dasgupta's published his work on sociolinguistics The Otherness of English: India's Auntie Tongue syndrome. The book made a huge impact with critics calling it a "brilliant intellectual tour de force"

Works (selection)

 Degree words in Esperanto and categories in universal grammar. In: Klaus Schubert: Interlinguistics: aspects of the science of planned languages, 1989 pp. 231–247
 Towards a dialogue between the sociolinguistic sciences and Esperanto culture. Language Problems and Language Planning.11.3.304-34. 1987.
 Explorations in Indian Sociolinguistics, Rajendra Singh, Probal Dasgupta, Jayant K. Lele. New Delhi: Sage 1995.
 After Etymology:Towards a Substantivist Linguistics. (With Alan Ford and Rajendra Singh). München: Lincom Europa. 2000
 
 
 Bayer, Josef and Dasgupta Probal (2016). Emphatic Topicalization and the Structure of the Left Periphery: Evidence from German and Bangla in. Syntax:19. pp 309–353
 Dasgupta Probal (2016).Luki Pre-demonstracyjne w Jezyku Bengalskim: Syntaktyczna i Semiotyczna Zdolnosz Odzyskiwania. Language Communication Information:11 pp 195–212

Translations from Bengali
Manashi DasGupta: Dormanta hejmaro, Antwerp: Flandra Esperanto-Ligo 2006
Manashi DasGupta: Mi juna, Rotterdam: Esperantaj Kajeroj 1989
Rabindranath Tagore: Primico, København: TK 1977
Upendronath Gangopaddhae: Klera edzino, Pisa: Edistudio 1994

Honours and awards
(a) LSA 2004- : Dasgupta was made an honorary member of the Linguistic Society of America in 2004.
(b) Bangiya Sahitya Parishat's Archana Choudhuri Prize 2012 : He was awarded the prestigious Archana Choudhari Prize in the year 2012 by the Bangiya Sahitya Parishat for his contributions. 
(c) West Bengal government's Vidyasagar-Dinamoyee Prize 2021 : In 2021, he was one of the four recipients of the Vidyasagar-Dinamoyee Prize awarded by the Government of West Bengal's Department of Higher Education. This prize (earlier called the Vidyasagar Prize) is given for the recipient's lifetime achievements. It commemorates Ishwarchandra Vidyasagar.

References

External links

Substantive language rights
Translation and the Application of Linguistics Article, Meta, vol. 39, n° 2, 1994, p. 374-386.
LiberaFolio.org

1953 births
Living people
Indian Esperantists
Presidents of the Universal Esperanto Association
20th-century Indian linguists
Linguists from Bengal
Writers from Kolkata